Euranet (European Radio Network) is a consortium of international, national, regional and local European broadcasters.

History
On 25 July 2007, 16 international, national, regional, and local European broadcasters from 13 EU countries formed a pan-European media consortium at the initiative of Deutsche Welle (DW) and Radio France Internationale (RFI). This includes both public and private broadcasters.

On 26 February 2008, Margot Wallström, vice-president of the European Commission, made the official presentation of the European media consortium Euranet in Brussels. In the first year, Euranet programmes were broadcast in the five main languages – German, English, French, Polish, and Spanish – as well as five additional languages – Bulgarian, Greek, Portuguese, Romanian, and Hungarian. Euranet has 26 professional radio stations and 10 campus radios as of July 2012.

Members
The following radio stations are members of Euranet:

Consortium
Euranet was founded as a consortium of radio enterprises from various European countries, and its operations are governed by a service contract with the European Commission, which is its sole source of funding.

Euranet University Circle
In addition to the participating radio stations, Euranet programmes are also re-broadcast by several campus radio stations. The local partner stations are associated members of the consortium. The partner broadcasters are:

  Finland: Radio Moreeni (University of Tampere)
  Ireland: Trinity FM (Trinity College Dublin)
  Germany: bonncampus 96,8 (University of Bonn)
  Poland: Academic Radio Kampus (University of Warsaw)
  Romania: UBB Radio (Babeş-Bolyai University)
  Spain: Radio Universidad de Salamanca (University of Salamanca), UAB, UNED Radio (UNED – Spanish National University of Distance Education)
  Sweden: Radio Campus Örebro (Örebro University)

References

External links

 

College and university associations and consortia in Europe
European Commission projects
International radio networks
Multilingual broadcasters
Publicly funded broadcasters
Radio in Europe
2008 establishments in the European Union